Carla Khan (Urdu: کارلا خان; born 18 August 1981) is a British Pakistani professional squash player. She is the granddaughter of Azam Khan, one of the legends of squash in Pakistan and daughter of Jacqui Stoter and Wasil Khan. She started playing squash in England at age 12. In her early life, her father Wasil Khan coached her in squash.

Khan has won five titles in her career: El Salvador Open 2002, Ottawa Open 2003, Pakistan Open 2005 and Iranian Open 2007 and Austrian Open in 2008. Her highest ranking was 21st. Her first tournament was at the prestigious British Open in 1999. After an unsuccessful  first full season in 2000, she made a breakthrough the following year, but it was not until 2002 that she won her first title.

In November 2002, at the El Salvador Open, she reached her first final against Mexican Samantha Terán. Khan beat her 9–1, 2–9, 9–3, 9–1. Her improvements continued in 2003, her most successful season yet, and won at the Ottawa International, where she came from behind to beat Melissa Martin from Australia, 3–9, 4–9, 9–4, 9–7, 9–3. She broke into the top 30.

At the Irish Open in 2004, Khan defeated Nicol David of Malaysia (who was ranked number 9 in the world at that time) on 15 April 2004, and achieved her highest ranking of 21. In 2005, Khan lost in the final of the Forbes Open to England's Alison Walters. However, she made it to the final of the 1st POF WISPA tournament in Pakistan, and beat Sharon Wee of Malaysia 9–1, 9–3, 9–4. Khan never dropped a set throughout the whole tournament. She ended the year by making it to yet another final, at the 4th Women Islamic Games 2005 in Tehran, but lost to Malaysian Tricia Chuah with a score of 1–9, 9–6, 1–9, 1–9.

In late 2005 she was unwell, and struggled in early 2006 until she collapsed during the 2006 South Asian Games on 24 August 2006 while playing against Joshna Chinappa from India. Khan was not expected to be back until 2008, but she returned playing in September 2007. This had seen her rankings slide outside the top 200, but she won her fourth title in 2007, at the Iranian open, beating Donna Urquhart in the finals.

In 2008, Khan defeated England's Emma Beddoes 9–2, 9–2, 9–0 to take the Austrian Open. 

Khan then retired. She made a comeback in 2009. However, unable to continue, she retired again and now has moved on to television presenting. She appeared on the ITV dating game show Take Me Out in January 2011.

Personal life
Khan is the daughter of English mother, Jacqui Stoter, and Pakistani squash player father Wasil Khan. She is the granddaughter of Azam Khan, second grand niece of Roshan Khan, Nasrullah Khan and Hashim Khan, niece of Sharif Khan, Rehmat Khan and Aziz Khan, third cousin of actress Sasha Agha and Natasha Khan (better known as Bat for Lashes, a British singer-songwriter), and actress Salma Agha is her second aunt.

References

External links 
Carla Khan's official website

Interview at Squashtalk.com
Return to playing at Paktribune.com
Carla Khan – Interview with Squash Queen of Pakistan
StarNow profile

Living people
1981 births
English female squash players
English people of Pakistani descent
Pakistani female squash players
British sportspeople of Pakistani descent
Khan family (squash)